Congo Run is a stream in Hancock County, West Virginia, in the United States.

It was named after the Congo River, in Africa.

See also
List of rivers of West Virginia

References

Rivers of Hancock County, West Virginia
Rivers of West Virginia